= Khmer Occupational Citizenship and Transportation Association =

Trade union for informal economy workers in Cambodia

KOCTA
- Founded: 2007
- Location: Cambodia
- Members: 575 (claimed)

The Khmer Occupational Citizenship and Transportation Association (KOCTA) is a trade union of informal economy workers in Cambodia. The union was established in 2008 and claims to represent 575 members in nine branches. KOCTA is not affiliated with any trade union federation.
